"1901" is a song by French indie pop band Phoenix. It was released on 23 February 2009 as the lead single from their fourth studio album, Wolfgang Amadeus Phoenix (2009). It peaked at number 73 in Canada and number 84 in the United States, making "1901" the band's first song to chart there. It also reached number one on the US Alternative Songs chart. The song has been covered by English singer Birdy.

Origin and description
It was released in February 2009 as the album's lead single, originally as a free download from the band's official website, but was issued as a retail single due to the song's popularity. A black-and-white music video for the song was released in May. In July, the song entered the U.S. Billboard Alternative Songs chart, where it later reached number one, becoming only the fourth independent label single to achieve the feat. The single was re-issued in the UK in February 2010. According to lead singer Thomas Mars, the song is about Belle Époque Paris. Mars said, "Paris in 1901 was better than it is now. So the song is a fantasy about Paris."

Phoenix performed "1901" on television programs such as The Tonight Show with Conan O'Brien, Late Show with David Letterman, Saturday Night Live, and MTV's It's On with Alexa Chung.

Critical reception
The song has received very positive reviews from music critics; Pitchfork's Jason Crock chose the song as a "Best New Track" and added that it's "just as smooth and spirited and dementedly catchy as any of their best singles." The Village Voices Pazz & Jop critics' poll ranked "1901" at number two to find the best music of 2009, after Jay-Zs "Empire State of Mind". In October 2009, "1901" ranked number 228 in Pitchforks list of "The Top 500 Tracks of the 2000s", the fifth-highest placement on the list amongst 2009 songs. The NME'''s Gavin Haynes praised the song's "rave-like stop-go guitars," while Evan Sawdey of PopMatters said it might be Phoenix's "finest song to date." Philadelphia Inquirer music critic Dan DeLuca described the song as "joyously exultant riff-happy pop." The song was ranked number two on Spin magazine's list of the "20 Best Summer Songs of 2009".

In popular culture
The song is featured in episodes of Friday Night Dinner, Gossip Girl, Melrose Place, The Vampire Diaries and  Hellcats, the trailer for the film New York, I Love You, television advertisements for PlayStation and the 2010 Cadillac SRX, and appears on the soundtrack to the NHL 2K10 video game. An edited version is also used as the theme tune for BBC Radio 5 Live's 6-0-6 football phone-in show.

Samples from the song were also used for the track "Triple Double" from Girl Talk's fifth studio album, All Day.

The song was released for the Rock Band series on January 19, 2010 along with "Lisztomania". It was released as part of a Phoenix Track Pack for Guitar Hero 5 on April 8, 2010. It appears on the Test Drive Unlimited 2 soundtrack. The song is also featured as the default music for the "Modern" template in the iOS version of iMovie. The song is also featured on the NHL 2K10 and NBA 2K13 soundtrack. The song appears on the soundtrack of Forza Horizon, playing on the Horizon Pulse in-game radio station, and in the free-to-play MMOTPS sandbox game APB: Reloaded (All Points Bulletin: Reloaded). In 2014, the song was featured in Boyhood.

Track listing
Promo CD single
 "1901" – 3:13

Charts
For the week ending December 19, 2009, "1901" debuted on the Billboard Hot 100 chart at number 90. It peaked at number 84 for the week ending January 23, 2010. The single reached number 73 on the Canadian Hot 100. The single topped the Billboard'' alternative chart for two weeks and became the second longest running song on the chart at the time at 57 weeks.

Certifications

Accolades

Birdy version

English singer Birdy released a cover version of the song on March 9, 2012 as a digital download in the United Kingdom.

Music video
The music video for "1901" was uploaded to YouTube on October 25, 2009. Featured artists include Helen George and Ian Roe.

Track listing

Charts

Release history

See also
List of Billboard number-one alternative singles of the 2010s

References

2009 songs
2009 singles
2012 singles
Phoenix (band) songs
Birdy (singer) songs
V2 Records singles
Black-and-white music videos
Songs written by Thomas Mars
Songs written by Laurent Brancowitz
Songs about Paris
Electronic rock songs
Songs used as jingles
Warner Music Group singles